Mario Andrea Rigoni (2 June 1948 – 15 October 2021) was an Italian writer. He worked as a professor of Italian literature at the University of Padua and was an editor of the works of Giacomo Leopardi and translated works by Emil Cioran.

Works

Essays
Saggi sul pensiero leopardiano (1982)
Chi siamo: letteratura e identità ital (2004)
Cioran dans mes souvenirs (2009)
In compagnia di Cioran (2011)
Ricordando Cioran (2012)
Marilyn Monroe (2012)
Il materialismo romantico di Leopardi (2013)

Editions
Variazioni sull’Impossibile (1993)
Elogio dell’America (2003)
Dall’altra parte. Racconti (2009)
Vanità (2010)
Elogio della sigaretta (2010)
Estraneità (2014)

References

1948 births
2021 deaths
Italian writers
People from Asiago
Academic staff of the University of Padua